Montgomery is a census-designated place (CDP) in Chatham County, Georgia, United States. The population was 4,443 at the 2020 United States Census, down slightly from 4,523 in 2010. It is a suburb of Savannah and is part of the Savannah metropolitan area.

Geography
Montgomery is located south of the center of Chatham County at  (31.943237, -81.106648). It occupies a neck of land bordered on the west by the Vernon River, on the east by the Moon River, and on the south by the Burnside River; all of which are tidal. The northeast border of the CDP is formed by Georgia SR 204 Spur, which leads to Skidaway Island.

History
Montgomery is believed to be the location of an early settlement in the Savannah area (prior to General Oglethorpe's land grant in 1733) founded by three brothers who were British baronets: William, James, and Robert Montgomery. They received a land grant in 1677. They failed to maintain a permanent settlement, due to poor location and disease, and therefore lost their grant. The brothers moved to the more established Virginia Colony. The name of the settlement continues in this area of Chatham county, as well as Old Montgomery Road, Montgomery Street, and Montgomery Crossroad.

Demographics

2020 census

As of the 2020 United States census, there were 4,443 people, 1,609 households, and 1,161 families residing in the CDP.

2000 census
As of the census of 2000, there were 4,134 people, 1,589 households, and 1,196 families residing in the CDP. The racial makeup of the CDP was 88.20% White, 9.29% African American, 0.10% Native American, 0.60% Asian, 0.34% Pacific Islander, 0.56% from other races, and 0.92% from two or more races. Hispanic or Latino of any race were 1.48% of the population.

There were 1,589 households, out of which 35.1% had children under the age of 18 living with them, 59.7% were married couples living together, 11.6% had a female householder with no husband present, and 24.7% were non-families. 20.0% of all households were made up of individuals, and 7.0% had someone living alone who was 65 years of age or older.  The average household size was 2.60 and the average family size was 3.00.

In the CDP, the population was spread out, with 25.7% under the age of 18, 7.4% from 18 to 24, 29.6% from 25 to 44, 27.3% from 45 to 64, and 10.1% who were 65 years of age or older.  The median age was 38 years. For every 100 females, there were 96.2 males.  For every 100 females age 18 and over, there were 92.5 males.

The median income for a household in the CDP was $52,889, and the median income for a family was $55,774. Males had a median income of $41,131 versus $25,750 for females. The per capita income for the CDP was $27,998.  About 2.1% of families and 4.0% of the population were below the poverty line, including 3.2% of those under age 18 and 5.4% of those age 65 or over.

Notable people
 

Henry McKenzie (died 1974), newspaper publisher and politician

References

Census-designated places in Chatham County, Georgia
Census-designated places in Georgia (U.S. state)
Savannah metropolitan area
Populated coastal places in Georgia (U.S. state)
1677 establishments in the British Empire